This is a list of bills that were introduced and passed into law and became ordinances of the territory by the Provisional Legislative Council that sat for a year from July 1997 to 1998.Laws passed before 1 July 1997 were passed by the provisional legislature that sat while the outgoing legislature was still sitting. They were not in effect until  the provisional legislature started its officially sittings and took over as the legislature of the territory on 1 July 1997.

Pre-Handover
 Holidays (1997 and 1998) Bill - replaced former Ordinance and holidays like the Queen's Birthday and Liberation Day with National holidays of China and Reunification Day
 Urban Council (Amendment) Bill 1997 - renaming it as Provisional Urban Council
 Regional Council (Amendment) Bill 1997 - renaming it as Provisional Regional Council
 District Boards (Amendment) Bill 1997 - renaming them as Provisional District Councils
 The Legislative Council Commission (Amendment) Bill 1997
 National Flag and National Emblem Bill - replaces former Ordinance and former symbols of British Hong Kong
 Regional Flag and Regional Emblem Bill - replaces former Ordinance and former symbols of British Hong Kong
 Societies (Amendment) Bill 1997
 Public Order (Amendment) Bill 1997
 Hong Kong Court of Final Appeal (Amendment) Bill 1997 - replaces the role of the Supreme Court of Hong Kong (High Court), references to the Attorney General of Hong Kong, Governor of Hong Kong
 Judicial Service Commission (Amendment) Bill 1997
 Immigration (Amendment) (No.3) Bill 1997 - regards to the HKSAR passport
 Oaths and Declarations (Amendment) Bill 1997 - removes reference to Colonial Affidavits Act 1859, Supreme Court of Hong Kong, Commissioner for Oaths Acts 1889 and 1891

Post Handover
 Hong Kong Reunification Bill
 United Nations Sanctions Bill
 Hong Kong Special Administrative Region Passport Bill
 Immigration (Amendment) (No.5) Bill 1997
 Chinese Nationality (Miscellaneous Provisions) Bill
 Legislative Provisions (Suspension of Operation) Bill 1997
 Electoral Affairs Commission Bill
 Inland Revenue (Amendment) (No.3) Bill 1997
 Dutiable Commodities (Amendment) (No.2) Bill 1997
 Legislative Council Bill - replaces the role of the Boundary and Election Commission with the Election Commission
 Hong Kong Court of Final Appeal (Amendment) (No.2) Bill 1997
 Hong Kong Court of Final Appeal (Amendment) (No.3) Bill 1997
 Employment and Labour Relations (Miscellaneous Amendments) Bill 1997
 Employment (Amendment) (No.5) Bill 1997
 Occupational Deafness (Compensation) (Amendment) (No.2) Bill 1997
 Sex Discrimination (Amendment) Bill 1997
 Cross-Harbour Tunnel (Cross-Harbour Tunnel Regulations) (Amendment) Ordinance 1997 (Amendment) Bill 1997
 Tate's Cairn Tunnel (Tate's Cairn Tunnel Regulations) (Amendment) Ordinance 1997 (Amendment) Bill 1997
 Provident Fund Schemes Legislation (Amendment) Bill 1997
 Mass Transit Railway Corporation (Amenemdnt) Bill 1997
 Protection of the Harbour (Amendment) Bill 1997
 Housing (Amendment) (No. 3) Bill 1997
 Immigration (Amendment) Bill 1998
 Housing (Amendment) Bill 1998
 Hong Kong Bill of Rights (Amendment) Bill 1998 - amended Sections 3(3) and 4 of the Hong Kong Bill of Rights Ordinance (1991) that contradicted with the Hong Kong Basic Law Article 39
 Land (Compulsory Sale for Redevelopment) Bill
 Prevention of Copyright Piracy Bill
 Fire Safety (Commercial Premises) (Amendment) Bill 1998
 Criminal Procedure (Amendment) Bill 1998
 Foreshore and Sea-bed (Reclamations) (Amendment) Bill 1998
 Roads (Works, Use and Compensation) (Amendment) Bill 1998
 Road Traffic (Validation of Collection of Fees) Bill
 Kowloon-Canton Railway Corporation (Amendment) Bill 1998
 Building Management (Amendment) Bill 1998
 Adaptation of Laws (Courts and Tribunals) Bill
 Adaptation of Laws (References to Foreign Country, Etc.) Bill
 Merchant Shipping (Registration) (Amendment) Bill 1998
 Adaptation of Laws (Crown Land) Bill
 Legal Practitioners (Amendment) Bill 1998
 Town Planning (Amendment) Bill 1998
 Appropriation Bill 1998
 Adaptation of Laws (Interpretative Provisions) Bill
 Adaptation of Laws (Nationality Related Matters) Bill
 Inland Revenue (Amendment) Bill 1998
 Inland Revenue (Amendment) (No. 2) Bill 1998
 Stamp Duty (Amendment) Bill 1998
 Stamp Duty (Amendment) (No. 2) Bill 1998
 Estate Duty (Amendment) Bill 1998
 Dutiable Commodities (Amendment) Bill 1998
 Air Passenger Departure Tax (Amendment) Bill 1998

Once passed, these bills became law or Ordinances.

See also

References

Other Site
 Provisional Legislative Council Bills

Provisional Government
1990s in Hong Kong
.x